Șoimii Pâncota was a Romanian professional football club from Pâncota, Arad County, Romania, founded in 1938. From August 2016, the home matches were played at Otto Greffner Stadium, in Șiria, Arad County, until their dissolution in October 2016.

History

Early Years
The first document dates from 1923, at that time the team was called  Spartak Pâncota. The team played in a landscaped garden on the site of the markets and the colors were green and white and played in the Western League with similar teams from Șiria, Lipova, Salonta, Arad, etc. Representative members of the batch at the time were: Beszeny, Vagalau, Cornel Vuia, Stark, Schmidth, Chebeleu, Hipp, Pohaner, Badovics, Ardelean, Coroban. In 1938, at the initiative of players the club changed its name from Spartak to Șoimii (The Falcons). 

After the Second World War, the team played on the current stadium, named after the club. 

In 1967–68 season, with Simion Buda and Iosif Retter among the players, Șoimii, won the first regional championship title in their history. Pâncotanii also had a period of force after the Romanian Revolution, finishing first in 1991–92, 1997–98, 2006–07 (as CNM Pâncota) in the Arad county league.

Top leagues
Șoimii Pâncota promoted to the 3rd league after 2011–12 successful season, finishing first in Liga IV Arad and winning the promotion play-off against CSM Vulcan. Also won the Romanian Cup county phase. 

At the end of 2013–14 Liga III, they finished 1st promoting for the first time ever in Liga II. In their first season in second league they finished at 9th place on the table.

At the end of the 2015–16 Liga II season, Șoimii saved from the relegation instead of teams with tradition in Romanian football, like Universitatea Cluj or FC Bihor Oradea, but in the summer of 2016, after Pâncota Municipality withdrew their financial support and forced the team to leave the stadium, the club was seen in the situation of not being able to continue the activity. Then in the last minute before the start of the championship, Pavel Piroș, the president of the club, decided to present at the matches with youth players. As a result, they managed to get some of the biggest counter-performance of Romanian football, 0–18 against Juventus București, 0–16 against CS Afumați and 0–14 against Foresta Suceava.

Honours
Liga III
Winners (1): 2013–14
Liga IV – Arad County 
Winners (4): 1991–92, 1997–98, 2006–07, 2011–12
Runners-up (3): 1999–2000, 2007–08, 2009–10
Regional Championship
Winners (1): 1967–68

Cupa României – Arad County
Runners-up (2): 2015–16, 2017–18

Other performances 
Appearances in Liga II: 3
Best finish in Liga II: 9th (2014–15)
Best finish in the Cupa României: Round of 32 (2012–13, 2014–15)

League history

References

External links
 Șoimii Pâncota Prosport page

Association football clubs established in 1938
Association football clubs disestablished in 2016
Defunct football clubs in Romania
Football clubs in Arad County
Liga II clubs
Liga III clubs
Liga IV clubs
1938 establishments in Romania
2016 disestablishments in Romania